Rock Crystal or rock crystal is:

 the name sometimes given to a variety of quartz
 a short novel Rock Crystal (novella) (1845) by Austrian writer Adalbert Stifter
(1805–1868)
 a 19th-century French objet d'art, the Rock Crystal (Fabergé egg)
 a type of decorative vase, rock crystal vase
 a ewer typical of Fatimid art
 one of a number of gemstones used for hardstone carving